John McGovern (September 15, 1887 – December 13, 1963) was an American college football player. He was elected to the College Football Hall of Fame in 1966.

Biography
McGovern was born in Arlington, Minnesota and attended high school in Arlington. McGovern played college football for the University of Minnesota, and was the junior captain and quarterback at the University of Minnesota. He led his team to the Big Nine conference (later the Big Ten Conference). McGovern was named an All-American by the Walter Camp Football Foundation and Look Magazine in 1909. McGovern played for the Minnesota Golden Golphers football team under coach Henry L. Williams. While at Minnesota, McGovern was a member of Alpha Tau Omega fraternity, and Phi Delta Phi, a law society.

After college graduation, he worked as a sports editor for a Minnesota newspaper and then practiced law in Washington D.C. McGovern died on December 13, 1963 in Le Sueur, Minnesota.

See also
 Minnesota Golden Gophers football under Henry L. Williams

In literature
In F. Scott Fitzgerald's This Side of Paradise, John McGovern was on the mind of protagonist Amory Blaine.

References

External links
 

1880s births
1963 deaths
American football quarterbacks
Macalester Scots football coaches
Minnesota Golden Gophers football players
All-American college football players
College Football Hall of Fame inductees
People from Sibley County, Minnesota
Players of American football from Minnesota